Masdevallia civilis is a species of orchid occurring from Venezuela to Peru.

References

External links 

civilis
Orchids of Peru
Orchids of Venezuela